Fardella is a town and comune of 598 residents, in the province of Potenza, in the southern Italian region of Basilicata.

References

Cities and towns in Basilicata